Families (original title: Belles Familles) is a 2015 French comedy-drama film co-written and directed by Jean-Paul Rappeneau, his first directorial effort since 2003's Bon Voyage. Filming began on 16 June 2014 in Blois. The film was released in theatres on 14 October 2015. It was shown in the Special Presentations section of the 2015 Toronto International Film Festival.

Cast 
 Mathieu Amalric as Jérôme Varenne
 Marine Vacth as Louise 
 Gilles Lellouche as Grégoire Piaggi  
 Nicole Garcia as Suzanne Varenne  
 Karin Viard as Florence Deffe 
 Guillaume de Tonquédec as Jean-Michel Varenne 
 André Dussollier as Pierre Cotteret
 Gemma Chan as Chen-Lin 
 Claude Perron as Fabienne
 Jean-Marie Winling as Vouriot
 Yves Jacques as Maître Ribain

References

External links

 

2015 films
2015 comedy-drama films
2010s French-language films
French comedy-drama films
Films directed by Jean-Paul Rappeneau
Films with screenplays by Jean-Paul Rappeneau
2010s French films